Hemicrepidius pallidipennis is a species of click beetle belonging to the family Elateridae.

References

Beetles described in 1843
pallidipennis
Taxa named by Carl Gustaf Mannerheim (naturalist)